Maccabi Haifa Football Club is an Israeli association football club based in Haifa. The club was formed in 1913 as a local branch of the Maccabi movement, and played their first competitive matches before the establishment of the State of Israel. Since then, more than 300 players have made a competitive first team appearance for the club, of whom almost 100 players have made at least 100 appearances (including substitute appearances); those players are listed here, as well as those who have played fewer matches but have made significant contributions to the club's history (e.g. Haim Revivo and Yakubu).

For a list of all Maccabi Haifa players, major or minor, with a Wikipedia article, see :Category:Maccabi Haifa F.C. players. For the current Maccabi Haifa first-team squad, see the First-team squad section of the club's main article.

Players are listed according to the date of their first team debut for the club. Appearances and goals are for first-team competitive matches only; friendly matches are excluded.

List of players

Table headers
 Apps – Number of games played as a starter
 Sub – Number of games played as a substitute
 Total – Total number of games played, both as a starter and as a substitute

Statistics correct as of match played 8 July 2022

Club First Captains

Club Vice Captains

References
 

 
Lists of association football players by club
Maccabi
Association football player non-biographical articles